Eurelijus Žukauskas (born August 22, 1973) is a retired Lithuanian professional basketball player. At a height of 2.18 m (7'2") tall, and a weight of 118 kg (260 lbs.), he played at the center position.

Professional career
In the 1995 NBA Draft, Žukauskas was selected with the #54 draft pick by the Seattle SuperSonics, in the second round of the draft. On June 28, 1995, the Milwaukee Bucks acquired his rights from Seattle. In 2007, he signed a one-year contract with the Lithuanian club Žalgiris Kaunas, which he later renewed for another year.

He retired from playing professional basketball on May 20, 2009.

National team career
Žukauskas played with the senior Lithuanian national basketball team, from 1995 to 2004.

Post-playing career
Žukauskas currently plays recreational basketball in his hometown of Klaipėda, and he also acts as a judge at the Lithuanian League (LKL) Slam Dunk Contest.

Career statistics

EuroLeague

|-
| style="text-align:left;"| 2000–01
| style="text-align:left;"| Paf Wennington Bologna
| 11 || 5 || 13.0 || .392 || .1000 || .568 || 3.5 || .2 || 1.5 || .5 || 6.2 || 6.5
|-
| style="text-align:left;"| 2004–05
| style="text-align:left;"| Ülker Istanbul
| 22 || 22 || 27.0 || .636 || .000 || .558 || 7.0 || .8 || .7 || style="background:#CFECEC;"|1.8 || 10.7 || 15.5
|-
| style="text-align:left;"| 2007–08
| style="text-align:left;"| Žalgiris
| 19 || 19 || 18.1 || .475 || .000 || .353 || 4.4 || .8 || .3 || 1.4 || 3.6 || 5.4
|-
| style="text-align:left;"| 2008–09
| style="text-align:left;"| Žalgiris
| 7 || 2 || 9.2 || .333 || .000 || .000 || 1.6 || .6 || .3 || .9 || 1.1 || 1.4

Awards and achievements

Clubs
EuroLeague champion: (1999)
3× Lithuanian League Champion: (1998, 1999, 2008)
Lithuanian All-Star Game Slam Dunk Contest Champion: (1999)
FIBA Europe League Champion: (2004)
2× Baltic League champion: (2007, 2008)
Lithuanian League runner-up: (2007)
Lithuanian Cup winner: (2008)

Lithuanian senior national team
1996 Summer Olympic Games: 
2000 Summer Olympic Games: 
FIBA EuroBasket 2003:

References

External links 
Euroleague.net Profile

1973 births
Living people
Basketball players at the 1996 Summer Olympics
Basketball players at the 2000 Summer Olympics
Basketball players at the 2004 Summer Olympics
BC Neptūnas players
BC Rytas players
BC UNICS players
BC Žalgiris players
Centers (basketball)
FIBA EuroBasket-winning players
Fortitudo Pallacanestro Bologna players
Greek Basket League players
Lithuanian expatriate basketball people in Greece
Lithuanian expatriate basketball people in Italy
Lithuanian expatriate basketball people in Russia
Lithuanian expatriate basketball people in Turkey
Lithuanian men's basketball players
Medalists at the 1996 Summer Olympics
Medalists at the 2000 Summer Olympics
Olympiacos B.C. players
Olympic basketball players of Lithuania
Olympic bronze medalists for Lithuania
Olympic medalists in basketball
Seattle SuperSonics draft picks
Basketball players from Klaipėda
Ülker G.S.K. basketball players
1998 FIBA World Championship players